Théodore Michel was a Luxembourgian swimmer. He competed in the men's 200 metre breaststroke event at the 1920 Summer Olympics.

References

External links
 

Year of birth missing
Year of death missing
Luxembourgian male swimmers
Olympic swimmers of Luxembourg
Swimmers at the 1920 Summer Olympics
Place of birth missing
Male breaststroke swimmers